An Official Secrets Act (OSA) is legislation that provides for the protection of state secrets and official information, mainly related to national security but in unrevised form (based on the UK Official Secrets Act 1911) can include all information held by government bodies.

OSAs are currently in-force in over 40 countries (mostly former British colonies) including Bangladesh, Kenya, Pakistan, Hong Kong, India, Ireland, Myanmar, Uganda, Malaysia, Singapore and the United Kingdom, and have previously existed in Canada and New Zealand.

There were earlier English and British precedents, long before the acts enumerated here. As early as the 16th Century, following Francis Drake's circumnavigation, Queen Elizabeth I declared that all written accounts of Drake's voyages were to become the 'Queen's secrets of the Realm'. In addition, Drake and the other participants of his voyages were sworn to their secrecy on the pain of death; the Queen intended to keep Drake's activities away from the eyes of rival Spain.

Countries and legislation

Australia
Australia previously had Part VII of the Crimes Act 1914 (Commonwealth), entitled Official Secrets and Unlawful Soundings, since repealed and replaced with Part 5.6 – Secrecy of Information of the Criminal Code Act (1995).

Canada
The British Official Secrets Act 1889 (52 & 53 Vict. c. 52) was adopted in Canada with minor modifications in 1890. Its provisions became part of the Criminal Code in 1892. The Official Secrets Act (Canada) 1939 replaced the Criminal Code provisions and utilised the provisions of the British Official Secrets Acts 1911 and 1920. Amendments were made in 1950, 1967, 1970 and 1973. The Official Secrets Act (Canada) 1981 was the final version of that law adopted by the House of Commons. 

In 2001, the Act was repealed and replaced by the Security of Information Act, created in the wake of September 11, 2001 attacks to replace the vaguely-worded Official Secrets Act.
 
Twenty-two prosecutions occurred under the Official Secrets Act in Canada, over half of which were in relation to the Gouzenko Affair. In 1989, Stephen Joseph Ratkai was charged and convicted under the Act, of espionage in relation to the SOSUS network site at Naval Station Argentia in Newfoundland.

Hong Kong
Hong Kong has the Official Secrets Ordinance 1997 (Cap. 521), in which it is largely based on the British Official Secrets Acts 1911 to 1989.

India

Ireland
Ireland has the Official Secrets Act 1963, that repealed the previous British legislation of 1911 and 1920. The Official Secrets Act, as amended, applies to all civil servants and potentially anyone within the state. A suit may only be instigated at the approval of the Attorney General of Ireland, additionally proceedings may occur in camera but the verdict and any sentence must occur in public.

Jersey
Jersey has the Official Secrets (Jersey) Law 1952.

Malaysia
Malaysia has the Official Secrets Act 1972, prohibiting the collection, possession or distribution of information marked as an official secret – an action which can be made by any public officer. The certification of a document as an official secret is not subject to judicial review, and a violation of the act is punishable with between one and seven years' imprisonment. The act has been controversial for its use to silence dissent and stifling anti-corruption activities.

New Zealand
In New Zealand, the Official Secrets Act 1951 was repealed by the Official Information Act 1982.

Singapore
In Singapore, the Official Secrets Act (Cap. 213, 2012 Rev. Ed.) prohibits the disclosure of official documents and information. 

The Act was first introduced to Singapore in 1935 as the Official Secrets Ordinance. Section 5 of the Act prohibits the wrongful communication of information that is considered sensitive by the government.

United Kingdom
Official Secrets Acts of the UK include:
Official Secrets Act 1889
Official Secrets Act 1911
Official Secrets Act 1920
Official Secrets Act 1939
Official Secrets Act 1989

People working with sensitive information are commonly required to sign a statement to the effect that they agree to abide by the restrictions of the Official Secrets Act.  This is popularly referred to as "signing the Official Secrets Act". Signing this has no effect on which actions are legal, as the act is a law, not a contract, and individuals are bound by it whether or not they have "signed" the act. Signing it is intended more as a reminder to the person that they are under such obligations. 

In addition to the Official Secrets Acts, the repealed Naval Discipline Act 1957 made it an offence to spy on-board Royal Navy ships or overseas bases. It was punishable by life imprisonment and was a capital offence until 1981.

United States

The United States does not have a broad-reaching Official Secrets Act, although the Espionage Act of 1917 has similar components. Much of the Espionage Act remains in force, although some has been struck down by the Supreme Court as unconstitutional because of the First Amendment (see United States v. The Progressive, Brandenburg v. Ohio, New York Times Co. v. United States). , enacted in 1951, makes dissemination of secret information involving cryptography, espionage, and surveillance illegal for all people, and is thus an "official secrets act" limited to those subjects.

See also
 DSMA-Notice, or D-Notice
 List of short titles

Notes and references

External links
 Troubled history of Official Secrets Act, BBC News Online
 Canada's Security of Information Act 
 Christopher Moran, Classified: Secrecy and the State in Modern Britain (Cambridge: Cambridge University Press, 2012).

National security policies
Classified information
Classified information in the United Kingdom
Acts of the Parliament of the United Kingdom
English criminal law